Evochron Alliance is a shareware First Person 3D Space Combat & Mercenary Simulation Windows game by American indie developer StarWraith 3D Games and sequel to Evochron. It features zero gravity inertia based 'Newtonian' style flight model with complete 3-way rotation and 3-way direction control.

Gameplay 
Evochron was technically a sequel to RiftSpace and was largely designed around the feedback received from the original game. Freeform gameplay was expanded substantially by allowing the player to transport and trade commodities and mine material from asteroids. Gameplay was also entirely real time, so there were no cut scenes or menus that suspended the game's universe. Seamless planetary descents were introduced with Evochron, allowing players to travel from space to stations on a planet's surface and back again without cut scenes, immediate scene changes, or loading screens. Long-distance travel was managed with built-in jump drives rather than jump gates, giving the player control over when and where they travelled from system to system. Ship-to-ship trading and multiplayer were also introduced. The game was discontinued and upgraded to Evochron Alliance.

Evochron Alliance was the sequel to the original Evochron. It featured several major improvements requested by players, including a new shipyard that lets the player customize their ship for offense, defense, exploration, and/or speed. New modification options allow players to customize many aspects of the game's design from the cockpit to the ships themselves. A new dedicated interactive training mode helped introduce players to the game. The Newtonian physics were adjusted to a more manageable system by player request. New objects were also introduced such as hidden storage containers with free items, planetary moons, particle nebula clouds, and wormholes. Many new systems were also introduced, including three Vonari systems.

While Arvoch Conflict was in development, Starwraith 3D Games also worked on applying the cockpit graphics system to Evochron Alliance. Evochron Alliance 2.0 implemented the new 3D cockpit and HUD system while also introducing all-new ship models. 2.0 also added support for TrackIR and panning first person view control. Directional shielding was added along with several improvements to customizing options, gameplay, and control options.

It has multiplayer capabilities with up to 24 players.

Its successor, Evochron Renegades, was released in September, 2007.

External links 
 Evochron Alliance - The official homepage
 Timeline of various games

2005 video games
Windows games
Windows-only games
Star Wraith
Space trading and combat simulators
Video games developed in the United States
Multiplayer online games
Space MOGs